Argyropeza izekiana is a species of sea snail, a marine gastropod mollusk in the family Procerithiidae.

Description

Distribution

References

Procerithiidae
Gastropods described in 1949